Article 2 of the European Convention on Human Rights protects the right to life. The article contains a limited exception for the cases of lawful executions and sets out strictly controlled circumstances in which the deprivation of life may be justified. The exemption for the case of lawful executions has been subsequently further restricted by Protocols 6 (restriction of the death penalty to war time) and 13 (abolition of the death penalty), for those parties who are also parties to those protocols.

The European Court of Human Rights has commented that "Article 2 ranks as one of the most fundamental provisions in the Convention". The obligations on a State under Article 2 consist of three principal aspects: the duty to refrain from unlawful deprivation of life; the duty to investigate suspicious deaths; and in certain circumstances, a positive obligation to take steps to prevent avoidable losses of life.

Deprivation of life

The first, and most obvious obligation under article 2 is for the state, through its agents, to refrain from itself causing the deprivation of life, that is to say that domestic law must regulate the permissible use of lethal force by agents of the state. The court first considered the obligations imposed by Article 2 in the case of McCann and Others v United Kingdom brought by the relatives of three individuals shot by members of the SAS in Gibraltar.

This case imposes two obligations to the State:

 To conduct a full, open and transparent investigations into why the public bodies have taken a life. This should be public, independent and should involve members of the family of the victims (R (Amin) v S.O.S. Home Dept)
 A positive duty to refrain from unlawful killing, better expressed as the "Duty of command, control and training" i.e. to ensure those who take the life (such as police marksmen) are highly trained and overseen at all times.

If the state has not followed these obligations then it will be found to be an unlawful killing. 
Further reading of cases on the matter include: Kelly and Others v UK; Osman v UK; McKerr v UK; Jordan v UK; Shanaghan v UK; and R(Amin) v SOS Home Dept itself.

Positive duty to protect life in certain circumstances

Article 2 has been interpreted to include the positive obligation of the state to ensure preventive measures are taken to protect citizens. The leading case on the matter is Osman v UK which overruled the UK court's decision in Hill v West Yorkshire as to the fact that public bodies could not be held to be negligent. Some cases establish further obligations for states. For instance, LCB v UK establishes a positive obligation for states to take "appropriate steps to safeguard the lives of those within their jurisdiction." 

Makaratzis v Greece pushes these obligations further, so that the state must have mechanisms to deter offenses against people. This was initially applied to the use of firearms. Although the court recognized the defensive benefits in gun ownership, it found a much larger threat in unchecked gun use.

Duty to investigate suspicious deaths

The investigation must be effective, independent and prompt. The duty to investigate is even stronger where the death has occurred whilst a person was detained by the state. The leading authority on this is Salman v Turkey (2000).

Use of force and exceptions in paragraph 2

This constitutes the negative obligation of the state under the convention. The states must under article 3 refrain from any random deprivation of life. This article however offers states a few exceptions to that rule. This constitutes a license to use force and is not to be construed as a license to kill.

The exceptions are well defined and are subject to a very narrow interpretation by the Court.

There are three conditions set by the court:
 The use of force must be absolutely necessary;
 It must be in defence of a third party;
 It must be subject to a proper and effective investigation which is both impartial and independent.
Key rulings in this matter are McCann and Others v United Kingdom, Makaratzis v Greece, and Nachova and others v Bulgaria.

Beginning of life

In 1980, the Court ruled out the foetal right to sue the mother carrying the foetus. In Paton v. United Kingdom, it was decided that the life of the foetus is "intimately connected with, and cannot be regarded in isolation from, the life of the pregnant woman".

The key ruling was Vo v France where the court ruled that due to lack of consensus over the matter in the member states, the court allows a margin of appreciation (usually reserved only for the derogable rights) to each state to determine whether a foetus falls under the protection of article 2.

The court, as it usually does in such unsettled matters, refrained from clarifying the issue further.

End of life
Euthanasia is the act of deliberately ending a person's life to relieve suffering. The only countries that have legalised euthanasia are Spain, Belgium, Luxembourg, the Netherlands, Canada and Colombia.

In the United Kingdom, the Suicide Act 1961 legalised the attempt to take one's own life, but it kept illegal the assistance of another's death.

Case law

1.	Legal and administrative framework
a.	Requirement for laws prohibiting the taking of life.
b.	Euthanasia, pretty much left to the margin of appreciation.
c.	No right to die as stated in Pretty v UK 2000.
d.	Amnesties of criminals – Dujardin v France 1991 – an amnesty is not a breach unless it is part of a systematic effort to prevent prosecution and punishment for murder...
e.	Regulation of activities posing risk to life – Nachova v Bulgaria; MP were allowed to use lethal force when arresting military personnel.
-	Oneryildiz v Turkey – dangerous industrial activity must be regulated and licensed and monitored.

2.	Law enforcement machinery
 Calvelli and Ciglio v Italy 2002 – Police delay in investigation meant time restrictions is taking civil action against negligent doctor, thus there was a breach on the part of the state for its failure to properly investigate.
 Vo v France 2004 – Involuntary abortion by a doctor, NO breach because the law did not encompass a 21-week-old foetus, whilst an amnesty applied to the other offense. FURTHER, the victim had recourse to civil litigation, which was deemed sufficient.

Preventive measures to protect life
 LBC v UK –‘appropriate steps’ to protect life principle... LCB had leukaemia, which she blamed on her father's presence at nuclear testing site, the UK had failed to inform them of the risks...held, and there was No liability because the injuries complained of were not reasonably foreseeable at the time with the information they had.
 Oneryildiz v Turkey, the LCB obligation to take appropriate steps applies in the context of any activity, public or private in which the right to life is at risk...especially industrial activities dangerous by nature.

Authorities knew or ought to have known of the risks and should have taken measures, which they did not thus breaching Article 3.
The LBC obligation applies more commonly to criminal cases.

In Osman v UK 1998 – THE OSMAN OBLIGATION:

The Osman criteria in action;

 Gongadez v Ukraine 2005 – The Court found a breach of the duty to take preventive measures when they did nothing to prosecute the murders police officers for a killing of an anti-government critic
 Akkoc v Turkey – failure by the authorities to take any steps against those threatening to kill my akkoc breached the osman criteria due to the specific nature of the threats and the fact that the authorities were well aware of them after petition.
The OSMAN obligation also applies to persons in detention
 Edward v UK 2001 – a prisoner killed by his cellmate who was mentally ill. Failure to pass on information regarding murderers state of mind and also failure to take any steps to protect Edward. In detention cases, there is a very high burden of proof put on the state to show they took reasonable steps to protect prisoner in their custody.
 Keenan v UK 2001 – suicidal prisoners must also be watched and preventive steps taken for their care.
 Saoud v France 2007 – a mentally ill person died whilst being arrested. Extreme force was used to pin him down for 30 minutes which caused his death by asphyxiation, the technique used was known to be dangerous and no test was done on him despite the presence of a doctor.
Torkel Opsahl suggests in his book 'European System', that there is no positive duty to force someone to live, but rather to provide the essentials for it, food and water, no more.

Health care and social services
Cyprus v Turkey 2001 – An obligation for health care exists to an undefined degree, at least it is a breach to deny it when offering it to general population.

Article 1 obligation to secure convention Rights and Article 3 obligation as set out in LCB to take 'appropriate steps' to protect life thus combine to create a general duty to investigate unnatural deaths for the purposes of creating accountability and deterring the breach of Article to right to life.

The Obligation to investigate is a general obligation for deaths, such as McCann v UK killings by government agents, Private killings such as Menson v UK and deaths caused by known persons such as Togcu v Turkey, Kyay Turkey, Yasa v Turkey, etc.

These investigations need not be criminal investigations depending on the circumstances. For example, the case of Powell v UK showed that disciplinary investigations of professional may be sufficient.

McCann v UK inquest held also satisfied the investigation requirement provided it is fair and impartial.

Nachova v Bulgaria shows that the state has a positive obligation to investigate death upon becoming aware of it, as opposed to receiving a complaint by family members.

Yasa v Turkey shows that a State of emergency DOES NOT excuse the obligation to investigate deaths.

Hugh Jordan v UK - The investigation can vary so long as it meets the strict requirements of effectiveness.

Effectiveness thus creates certain criteria to be followed:
 Investigators must be 'independent and impartial both at law and in practice'. Nachova v Bulgaria also requires good impartial conclusion based on evidence. Ergi v Turkey - There was a breach because the investigators relied solely on evidence provided by the police who were being investigated. Ramsahai v Netherlands - Evidence provided by the colleagues of those being investigated does not satisfy the requirements for impartial investigations even as in the case of Jordan v UK, the colleagues where supervised by independent body.
 Jordan v UK - investigation must be adequate, adequacy requires the investigation to show the cause of death and find those responsible for it.
 Jordan v UK - investigation must be fast and reasonably expedient.
 McKerr v UK - must allow for public scrutiny and provide punishments that would deter others, Oneryildiz v Turkey - Methane explosion in refuse tip caused a landslide which killed dozens of people living in a slum. The investigation found only 2 mayors to bear any responsibility who were given suspended sentences and the minimum statutory fine just under 10 euros. this was held by the court to fail in its requirement to allow public scrutiny and deter others.
 as in Jordan, Legal Aid may also need to be provided.

Abortion cases
Article 3 does not recognize an absolute right to life, in abortion cases there is a wide margin of appreciation because of the lack of consensus in Europe.

 X v UK - abortion of 10-week-old fetus to protect physical and mental health of women was not a breach.
 H v Norway - abortion of 12-week-old fetus for social reasons, to prevent putting the women in a 'difficult situation in life (literal interpretation of Norwegian statute)' was NOT A BREACH, again due to lack of consensus in Europe on the issue of abortion. The case was brought by the expectant father who did not want the abortion carried out.
 Vo v France - abortion done as a result of mistaken name and thus medical negligence. The Court did not consider the right to life issue, rather stating that civil remedies where available and thus that satisfied the requirement for legal and administrative framework as set out in LBC.
Evans v UK - same margin of appreciation doctrine as in VO, with specific reference to lack of European consensus thus necessitating a wide margin or appreciation. the ECHR cannot impose requirements, rather it protects minimum rights common to all the signatory states.

Taking life by force of arms
The taking of life by state agents is strictly prohibited except for exceptional circumstances, whilst private killings require investigation and legal and administrative protection.

Makaratzis v Greece - Car chase by police, lead to them shooting wildly at the car. No death resulted but there was found to be liability as the nature of the incident could have been lethal, thus the inadequacy of planning and conduct of the officers constituted a breach.

Killings by state agents are notoriously difficult to prove in many situations. In cases where a person is taken into custody, and dies, it is for the state to show how he died as was the case in Salman v Turkey. Demiray v Turkey - The explanation must be satisfactory.

Akkoc v Turkey - Killing by suspected state agent. State refused to support investigation and provide evidence, thus the court turned the burden of proof on the state to justify with holding information.
Estimarov v Russia - Reasons must be provided for the killing of the suspect.

The Burden of Proof issue is a difficult one which is somewhat mitigated by the fact that the court finds breaches in failures to investigate. Thus is a death occurs the state is obligated to investigate it which it is unlikely to do where one of its agents is responsible, thus there is a breach. The investigation must also be effective as in Jordan v UK. In other words, the state is caught between a rock and hard place.

In cases where persons have been detained by security forces and have subsequently disappeared the court has stated that two criteria must be satisfied:
 it must be shown beyond reasonable doubt that the missing person was detained by security forces or state agents.
 there must be 'sufficient circumstantial evidence, based on concrete elements, on which it may be concluded beyond reasonable doubt that the person is dead' Cakici v Turkey.

If these requirements are met, the burden of proof turns to the state to explain what has happened to the person.

The main problem here is that there is often no record of arrest, and further no way of obtaining circumstantial evidence. Kurt v Turkey - the son of the applicant was arrested by security forces. The state claimed the person had instead left with rebel fighters. The court had little evidence to show where the son had been taken and what happened to him. he had been missing for  years. the court refused to recognize that the arrest by the security forces was in its context life-threatening and thus refused to shift the burden onto the state.

 Timurtas v Turkey - applicant son arrest by security forces but unlike Kurt, he was taken to an identifiable location and was seen by other detainees in the facility for months. There was also an operational report shown to the court but was contested by the State. the court requested the state provide evidence to support its claims that the operational report was fake, the state refused on security grounds. thus the court turned the burden of proof on the state in order to show what had happened to the missing detainee and subsequently found a breach of article 3. The case is distinguished from Kurt because the applicant was missing for 6 years. further in the context of south east turkey, persons arrested on suspicion of having links to PKK rebels were shown in other cases such as Kaya, Yasa Kilic etc. to be life-threatening. The abducted person was suspected of these link. thus the circumstantial evidence was sufficient to turn the burden of proof. The requirement for circumstantial evidence DECREASES with the number of years the missing person is unaccounted for. Provided he was detained by the state.
 Cyprus v Turkey - The court was not ready to presume death for 1700 civilians that disappeared when the north was invaded.
 Baysayeva v Russia - This case totally discarded Kurt and went further than Timurtas in that there was NO circumstantial evidence to presume death. The Court simply relied on the fact that the abduction had been by unidentified state agents in uniform. there was no record of arrest and a procedural failure to investigate thus it was accepted that the arrest was life-threatening in the circumstances.

Permitted Killings Cases
Capital Punishment is effectively non existent in the signatory states. All states aside from Russia are signatories to Protocol 6 which bans death penalties in peace time. Further many states are signatories to Protocol 13 which bans it out right. Russia, although not being a signatory to either protocol has an effective moratorium on the death penalty.

The main issue here then is extradition to countries where the person life is at risk.

 Oscalan v Turkey - PKK leader arrest in Kenya, sentenced to death in Turkey. Had his sentence reduced to life imprisonment. At the time however, Turkey was in the process of signing protocol 6, thus there were genuine fears that due to his status and public opinion as well as political pressures he may be executed. The court found that there had been a breach of Article 6, unfair trial, thus to sentence him to death would be a Breach of Article 3.
 Soering v UK - also demonstrates how the Courts ineffectively use Article 3 to prohibit death sentences in the context of extradition. However the court did recognize Death Row Syndrome, in which psychological distress is caused while awaiting execution. Thus it is a breach of article 3 to sentence one to death, but death row syndrome itself does not constitute inhuman treatment.

Death from Permitted Use of force
McCann and Others v United Kingdom (1995) 21 EHRR 97 - shows us that force applied must be no more than 'absolutely necessary' meaning that it must be STRICTLY PROPORTIONATE' to the achieve the permitted purpose. This goes beyond proportionality as we find it in article 8 and others. it is extremely strict with no margin of appreciation afforded. the court simply construes facts as they are and reaches an impartial assessment.

Micheal O'Boyle says that the situation regarding shootings must be judged with the facts of the situation at the time and not ex post facto. this has also been a criticism of Dissenting judges in McCann v UK, who stated that the courts should be wary of the benefits of hind sight in their finding of a breach of article 3 on the case.

The use of deadly force must be lawful at a national level. C v Belgium, Kelly v UK, Stewart v UK and MUST meet the requirements of Lawfulness as set out in Article 5 and the case of Bozano v France thus meeting the rule of law requirement as expected in a democratic society so as to allow the citizens to conduct their lives accordingly as stated in Sunday times v UK.

Defence of oneself or of another
Firstly, shootings in defence of property is not allowed. The signatory states did not incorporate the 4th derogation of shooting to stop access to certain facilities which was suggested at the time or writing the treaty.

McCann v UK - soldiers did not breach article 3, they responded to a threat at the time and their response was lawful. the Breach was by the authorities in planning. firstly, they did not stop the suspects at the border which they should have. secondly, they used extremely lethal SAS soldiers who had been trained to kill and informed that the suspects had remote detonators, thus relying on false intelligence which they did not question.

Andronicou and Constantinou v Cyprus- police commando's raided flat in which man was holding fiancée hostage. NO Breach as the soldiers firing and thus killing both persons was in self-defence and defence of the fiancée. there was also no procedural preach of planning as in McCann because the authorities in the circumstances acted proportionally in self-defence of the fiancée who was in real and immediate danger.

Gul v Turkey - the raid on a flat suspected to have PKK militants was grossly disproportionate in its use of force.

Isayeva v Russia- rebels entered a town of 20,000. the Russian security forces responded with artillery and aircraft fire. they made available information to the population regarding a safe passage out of the town. the court found this inadequate whilst also finding the use of such lethal force on a crowded place to be disproportionate especially in peacetime. the breach was as a result of the planners to have regard for civilian lives.

Isayeva, Yosupova and Bazayeva v Russia- Air force plane reported receiving small arms fire from a convoy, and subsequently got authorization to attack. The air-to-ground missile attack killed scores of people, including the applicants' children. Subsequent investigations showed no presence of fighters in the convoy. The court rejected the state's argument of self-defence, as the use of such firepower was grossly disproportionate.

Nachova v Bulgaria- it is grossly disproportionate to use lethal force to effect an arrest, as the force cannot be considered absolutely necessary, especially when the person was not posing any threat, simply running away from Military Police who wanted to arrest him for dereliction of duty. Further, the court ruled in Kelly v UK that to shoot a person when seeking to arrest them defeats the purpose of the mission, which is to bring them before a court. It also rules out any future arrest and the fact that the victim will not get a chance to defend himself in law.

Riots and insurrections
Stewart v UK - 150 people throwing missiles at a patrol of soldiers amounted to a riot. Although the court has not laid down clear criteria as to what constitutes a riot.
thus the force used firing plastic bullets killing a 13-year-old boy was proportionate.

Gulec v Turkey - a crowd of several thousand throwing missiles at security forces and damaging property was also deemed to be a riot. There was however a breach here as the McCann obligations still apply regarding proportionality. So the security forces had fired shots at the ground near the rioters to scare them off. Ricochet bullets had thus killed applicants son. The Breach was found in that the authorities had no provided any riot equipment to the security forces even though a state of emergency was declared thus it was expectant that violence would occur. The operation had not been planned so as to minimize risk to the civilians.

X v Belgium - Police officer shot an innocent bystander in the course of a riot. He had no authorisation to use the weapon thus his actions were not lawful, therefore clear breach.

See also
European Convention on Human Rights
European Court of Human Rights

References

External links
D. Korff The right to life. A guide to the implementation of Article 2 of the European Convention on Human Rights Strasbourg, Council of Europe, 2006
 ECtHR factsheet on the abolition of death penalty

 

2